Plaiuri may refer to several villages in Romania:

 Plaiuri, a village in Pianu Commune, Alba County
 Plaiuri, a village in Petreștii de Jos Commune, Cluj County